Michael D. Sullivan (born November 9, 1952) is a former Canadian politician. He was a New Democratic member of the House of Commons of Canada from 2011 to 2015 who was elected to represent the Toronto riding of York South—Weston.

Background
Sullivan was born in Detroit, Michigan but grew up in Windsor, Ontario. Sullivan graduated from the University of Toronto with a Bachelor of Science degree in 1973. From February 1974 to November 1984, Sullivan worked for Canadian Broadcasting Corporation (CBC) where he was radio master control operator. From 1984 until his election to the House of Commons in 2011, Sullivan was a national representative for the National Association of Broadcast Employees and Technicians (NABET) and later the Communications Energy and Paperworkers (CEP) where he worked with CBC, Sun Media and Torstar newspapers.

Politics
Sullivan ran for the NDP in York South—Weston in the 2008 federal election. He lost to Liberal incumbent Alan Tonks by 6,430 votes. He ran again in 2011, this time defeating Tonks by 2,580 votes.

He served as the NDP's Deputy Critic for Housing and Disability Issues in the 41st Canadian Parliament. In the 2015 election, Sullivan lost his seat to Liberal candidate Ahmed Hussen by 7,622 votes.

Electoral record

References

External links

1952 births
American emigrants to Canada
Living people
Members of the House of Commons of Canada from Ontario
New Democratic Party MPs
Politicians from Detroit
Politicians from Toronto
Trade unionists from Michigan
Trade unionists from Ontario
University of Toronto alumni
21st-century Canadian politicians